The men's 1500 metre freestyle competition of the swimming events at the 1963 Pan American Games took place on April. The last Pan American Games champion was Alan Somers of US.

This race consisted of thirty lengths of the pool, all lengths being in freestyle.

Results
All times are in minutes and seconds.

Heats

Final 
The final was held on April.

References

Swimming at the 1963 Pan American Games